Lisseth Betzaida Ayoví Cabezas (born 7 August 1998) is an Ecuadorian weightlifter. She won the bronze medal in the women's +87kg event at the 2019 Pan American Games held in Lima, Peru.

Career 

She competed in the girls' +63kg event at the 2014 Summer Youth Olympics held in Nanjing, China.

In 2019, she won the bronze medal in the Clean & Jerk in her event at the Pan American Weightlifting Championships held in Guatemala City, Guatemala. After the competition the Mexican Tania Mascorro was banned for using Boldenone, so Ayoví won another two bronze medals (snatch and total).

In 2021, she won the bronze medal in the women's +87kg event at the 2020 Pan American Weightlifting Championships held in Santo Domingo, Dominican Republic.

She won two gold medals at the 2022 Bolivarian Games held in Valledupar, Colombia. She won the silver medal in the women's +87kg event at the 2022 Pan American Weightlifting Championships held in Bogotá, Colombia. She also won the silver medal in the Clean & Jerk event in this competition.

She won the gold medal in her event at the 2022 South American Games held in Asunción, Paraguay.

Achievements

References

External links 
 

Living people
1998 births
Place of birth missing (living people)
Ecuadorian female weightlifters
Weightlifters at the 2014 Summer Youth Olympics
Weightlifters at the 2019 Pan American Games
Medalists at the 2019 Pan American Games
Pan American Games bronze medalists for Ecuador
Pan American Games medalists in weightlifting
Pan American Weightlifting Championships medalists
South American Games gold medalists for Ecuador
South American Games medalists in weightlifting
Competitors at the 2022 South American Games
21st-century Ecuadorian women